Pleurolidiidae is a family of nudibranchs, shell-less marine gastropod molluscs or sea slugs, within the superfamily Aeolidioidea.

Genera and species
Genera and species within the family Pleurolidiidae include:
 Pleurolidia Burn, 1966
 Pleurolidia juliae Burn, 1966 
 Protaeolidiella Baba, 1955
 Protaeolidiella atra Baba, 1955

Pleurolidia juliae and Protaeolidiella atra are sister species according to DNA evidence and are poorly supported as members of the polyphyletic Facelinidae. As the family Facelinidae will be revised in the near future these species are currently placed in Pleurolidiidae.

References